In mathematics, more specifically in mathematical analysis, the Cauchy product is the discrete convolution of two infinite series. It is named after the French mathematician Augustin-Louis Cauchy.

Definitions
The Cauchy product may apply to infinite series or power series. When people apply it to finite sequences or finite series, that can be seen merely as a particular case of a product of series with a finite number of non-zero coefficients (see discrete convolution).

Convergence issues are discussed in the next section.

Cauchy product of two infinite series

Let  and  be two infinite series with complex terms. The Cauchy product of these two infinite series is defined by a discrete convolution as follows:

     where     .

Cauchy product of two power series

Consider the following two power series

     and     

The Cauchy product of these two power series is defined by a discrete convolution as follows:

     where     .

Convergence and Mertens' theorem

Let  and  be real or complex sequences. The theorem is still valid in a Banach algebra (see first line of the following proof).

It is not sufficient for both series to be convergent; if both sequences are conditionally convergent, the Cauchy product does not have to converge towards the product of the two series, as the following example shows:

Example
Consider the two alternating series with

which are only conditionally convergent (the divergence of the series of the absolute values follows from the direct comparison test and the divergence of the harmonic series). The terms of their Cauchy product are given by

for every integer .

for every integer .

Proof of Mertens' theorem
For simplicity, we will prove it for complex numbers. However, the proof we are about to give is formally identical for an arbitrary Banach algebra (not even commutativity or associativity is required).

Assume without loss of generality that the series  converges absolutely.
Define the partial sums

with

Then

by rearrangement, hence

Fix .

(this is the only place where the absolute convergence is used). Since the series of the  converges, the individual  must converge to 0 by the term test. Hence there exists an integer  such that, for all integers ,

By the definition of convergence of a series,  as required.

Cesàro's theorem

In cases where the two sequences are convergent but not absolutely convergent, the Cauchy product is still Cesàro summable.  Specifically:

This can be generalised to the case where the two sequences are not convergent but just Cesàro summable:

Theorem

Examples

Then  by definition and the binomial formula. Since the limit of the Cauchy product of two absolutely convergent series is equal to the product of the limits of those series, we have proven the formula  for all .
 As a second example, let  for all . Then  for all  so the Cauchy product  does not converge.

Generalizations

The Cauchy product can be defined for series in the  spaces (Euclidean spaces) where multiplication is the inner product. In this case, we have the result that if two series converge absolutely then their Cauchy product converges absolutely to the inner product of the limits.

Products of finitely many infinite series 
Let  such that  (actually the following is also true for  but the statement becomes trivial in that case) and let  be infinite series with complex coefficients, from which all except the th one converge absolutely, and the th one converges. Then the limit

exists and we have:

Proof 
Because

This is our induction base.

The induction step goes as follows: Let the claim be true for an  such that , and let  be infinite series with complex coefficients, from which all except the th one converge absolutely, and the -th one converges. We first apply the induction hypothesis to the series . We obtain that the series

converges, and hence, by the triangle inequality and the sandwich criterion, the series

converges, and hence the series

converges absolutely. Therefore, by the induction hypothesis, by what Mertens proved, and by renaming of variables, we have:

Relation to convolution of functions 
A finite sequence can be viewed as an infinite sequence with only finitely many nonzero terms, or in other words as a function  with finite support.

More generally, given a monoid S, one can form the semigroup algebra  of S, with the multiplication given by convolution.

Notes

References
.

.

.

.

.

.

.

.

.

.

.

.

.

External links
.
.
Augustin-Louis Cauchy
Real analysis
Complex analysis
Sequences and series
Articles containing proofs